Otto Schindler may refer to:
 Otto Schindler (canoeist)
 Otto Schindler (zoologist)